Coleophora semistrigata is a moth of the family Coleophoridae. It is found in Libya, Morocco and Tunisia.

References

semistrigata
Moths of Africa
Moths described in 1952